The following is a list of political parties in Transnistria. Transnistria has a multi-party system.

Political parties

Active parties 
Parties which are either represented in parliament, or are actively fielding candidates in parliamentary elections.
 Renewal (Obnovlenie) – registered in 2000 – governing party since 2005
Pridnestrovie Communist Party (PCP) – registered in 2003
 Liberal Democratic Party of Pridnestrovie (LDPP) – registered in 2006

Defunct or inactive parties 
Parties and political organizations which have been disbanded or are no longer fielding candidates in parliamentary elections.
 Breakthrough (Proriv) – registered in 2006
 Communist Party of Pridnestrovie (PCP-PCUS)
 Fair Republic (Republică Justă) – founded on 3 July 2007 
 For Accord and Stability
 Movement for the Development of Nistru (Miscarea pentru dezvoltarea de Nistru)
 Patriotic Party of Pridnestrovie (Partidul Patriotic) – registered in 2006
 People's Will (Voinţă Populară) – registered in 2006
 Position (Poziţie)
 Power to the People (Vlast Narodu)
 Republic (Republica) – registered in 2007
 Return (Povernennia)
 Social Democratic Party of Pridnestrovie (Partidul Social Democrat) – registered in 2007
 Union of Patriotic Forces (Uniunea Patriotic Forţelor)
 United Work Collective Council (Sovietul de Colectivele de Muncă Unite)
 Unity (Unitate)

See also 
 List of political parties in Moldova
 Lists of political parties

References 

Transnistria
 

Political parties